The Boulevard d'Athènes is a historic boulevard in Marseille, France. Situated in the 1st arrondissement of Marseille, it runs from Rue Marcel Sembat (off the Gare de Marseille-Saint-Charles) to the Allée Léon Gambetta, where it becomes the Boulevard Dugommier and finally meets the Canebière.

References

1st arrondissement of Marseille
Streets in Marseille
Boulevards in France